Saint-Martin-sur-Nohain is a commune in the Nièvre department in central France.

See also
 Communes of the Nièvre department

References

External links
 

Communes of Nièvre